Holcopasites stevensi is a species of cuckoo bee in the family Apidae. It is found in Central America and North America.

References

Further reading

External links

 

Nomadinae
Articles created by Qbugbot
Insects described in 1915